Glaucoclystis sinuosa is a moth in the family Geometridae first described by Charles Swinhoe in 1895. It is found in the north-eastern Himalayas.

Subspecies
Glaucoclystis sinuosa sinuosa
Glaucoclystis sinuosa nigrilineata (Hampson, 1896)
Glaucoclystis sinuosa reddita (Prout, 1958)

References

External links
Original description: Swinhoe, C. (1895). "New Species of Indian Epiplemidae, Geometridae, Thyrididae, and Pyralidae". Annals and Magazine of Natural History. (6) 16 :295.

Moths described in 1895
Eupitheciini